= Advertising Ethics Board =

Polish self-regulatory organization

The Advertising Ethics Board (Polish: Rada Reklamy) is a Polish self-regulatory organization representing the advertising and media industries. Founded in 2006, it is responsible for establishing and enforcing ethical standards in commercial communication in Poland. It is a member of the European Advertising Standards Alliance (EASA).

== History and structure ==
The organization was established by the Union of Associations Advertising Council (Związek Stowarzyszeń Rada Reklamy), which includes representatives of advertisers, advertising agencies, and media outlets. The operational foundation of the organization is the Code of Ethics in Advertising (Kodeks Etyki Reklamy). The Board is managed by a president and a management board representing the communication industry.

The main administrative body is the Advertising Ethics Commission (Komisja Etyki Reklamy). The Commission investigates consumer complaints and evaluates whether specific campaigns violate ethical norms, such as the protection of minors, social responsibility, and truthfulness in communication.

== Functioning ==
The Commission reviews complaints submitted by individual consumers, consumer rights organizations, and competing enterprises. The Board also issues broader guidelines regarding ethical communication, such as the proper use of historical elements in advertising. While the decisions issued by the Commission are not legally binding court judgments, they act as industry self-regulation. Signatories of the Code commit to voluntarily complying with the rulings, which generally result in the modification or withdrawal of disputed advertisements.
